United Conservative Party may refer to:

 United Conservative Party (Alberta)
 United Conservative Party (Chile)